Llwyneinion is a village in Wrexham County Borough, Wales. It is part of the community of Esclusham. Its name can be translated from the Welsh language as "Einion's Grove", although until at least the 19th century the name was more commonly written as Llwynenion, "Enion's Grove".

Llwyneinion has appeared in records since at least the 17th century and was once one of the properties owned by Elihu Yale, having been bought by his father. There is a long industrial heritage in the area, with coal mining, iron ore mining, and iron smelting present from the 18th century onwards. Several pits were opened in the 1750s by Isaac Wilkinson, who used the ore at his nearby works at Bersham. The pits at Llwyneinion became the main source of iron ore for local industries in the 18th century, and a furnace was constructed there by Thomas Jones in the early 19th century. Despite this industrial past, the immediate area is now largely rural in character.

In 2011 Llwyneinion won a Silver Gilt award in the small villages category of the Wales in Bloom awards.

Llwyneinion acid tar lagoon
The industrial site in the village later became a brickworks and clay pit, which operated between about 1820 and 1964. After the closure of the clay pits the site was used until 1972 for dumping of highly toxic industrial waste, mostly from the Burmah-Castrol company at Ellesmere Port, comprising around 94000 tons of sulphuric acid mixed with tar-like hydrocarbons, 7500 tons of spent bentonite containing absorbed heavy oil, and over 1000 metal drums with unknown contents, comprising one of the largest instances of such dumping in the UK. The waste was tipped into the unlined quarry, creating a 1.3 hectare lagoon containing a layer of 75mm of volatile hydrocarbon floating on 0.5m of water, itself overlaying perhaps 10m of tar waste and three possibly uncapped mine shafts. The site, along with an adjacent tip used for dumping of chemical waste from the Monsanto works in Cefn Mawr, was purchased in 1980 from the landowners for £1 by the then local authority Clwyd County Council, as the latter was concerned about environmental contamination. In August 1980 the lagoon site caught fire, resulting in the temporary evacuation of nearby Rhosllanerchrugog.

The lagoon site, which is now surrounded by woodland, is yet to be cleared and is still considered the most problematic and hazardous waste site in North Wales. In 2007 the Environment Agency Wales ruled that the site did not represent a significant risk to human health as access was restricted and the majority of volatiles had burnt off. A variety of plans have been put forward for decontamination, though none have yet been implemented due to the high estimated cost of the remediation work.

See also
Brofiscin Quarry

References

Villages in Wrexham County Borough
Landfills in the United Kingdom